John Aboud III (born March 7, 1973) is an American writer and comedian. With Michael Colton, he was a regular commentator on Best Week Ever and other VH1 shows. From 2000 to 2003, the two founded Modern Humorist, a parody website based in Brooklyn, New York. Prior to the creation of Modern Humorist, Aboud worked as a freelance writer for magazines and Web sites. In 1996, he was among the first copywriters at Grey Advertising's online division.

Early life and education
He graduated from Douglas S. Freeman High School in suburban Richmond, Virginia. Aboud graduated from Harvard University in 1995. He was an editor of the Harvard Lampoon  and served as president in 1994.

Personal life 
In May 2000 Aboud married Molly Bridget Confer, the deputy editor of Teen People Online.

Filmography

Movies

References

External links
 Colton & Aboud homepage
 Modern Humorist
 
 Interview in the Crimson
 Interview in Gelf Magazine
 Scene Missing Magazine Interviews John Aboud

1973 births
Living people
People from Henrico County, Virginia
American male comedians
21st-century American comedians
American people of Lebanese descent
The Harvard Lampoon alumni